Staré Hradiště is a municipality and village in Pardubice District in the Pardubice Region of the Czech Republic. It has about 1,900 inhabitants.

Administrative parts
Villages of Brozany and Hradiště na Písku are administrative parts of Staré Hradiště.

References

External links

Villages in Pardubice District